is a single by Japanese band An Cafe. The single comes in three editions; the 2 limited versions including a bonus DVD with videoclip and a special Europe Footage. The title track will be featured in their album BB Parallel World. The song peaked at No. 13 on the Japanese singles chart.

Track listing
Disc one (CD)
"Natsu Koi ★ Natsu GAME" (夏恋★夏GAME) – 4:01
"Boku Ha Soba Ni Iru Kara" (ボクは側にいるから) – 3:25

Disc two (DVD, Limited edition type A only)
"Natsu Koi ★ Natsu GAME Clip" (夏恋★夏GAME)

Disc two (DVD, Limited edition type B only)
Bonus DVD including featuring footage from their live stage performance.

Personnel
Miku – vocals
Takuya – guitar
Kanon – bass guitar
Yuuki – electronic keyboard
Teruki – drums

References

An Cafe songs
2009 singles
Japanese-language songs
2009 songs
Loop Ash Records singles